Geovani Cortes Gomes (born 23 January 1993), commonly known as Geovani, is a Brazilian footballer who currently plays as a midfielder for México ese Expansión Ligue MX side Tepatitlán F.C.

Career statistics

Club

Notes

References

External links

1993 births
Living people
Brazilian footballers
Brazilian expatriate footballers
Association football midfielders
Sporting CP footballers
Hamburger SV players
FC Schalke 04 players
Hertha BSC players
Botafogo de Futebol e Regatas players
Ceres Futebol Clube players
Bangu Atlético Clube players
Bonsucesso Futebol Clube players
Serra Talhada Futebol Clube players
Americano Futebol Clube players
Santa Cruz Futebol Clube players
SC Sagamihara players
J3 League players
Brazilian expatriate sportspeople in Portugal
Expatriate footballers in Portugal
Brazilian expatriate sportspeople in Germany
Expatriate footballers in Germany
Brazilian expatriate sportspeople in Japan
Expatriate footballers in Japan
Footballers from Rio de Janeiro (city)